Hunted Men (German: Gehetzte Menschen) is a German silent film made in 1924 and directed by Erich Schönfelder and starring Lucy Doraine, Johannes Riemann and Hans Albers.

Cast
Lucy Doraine as Margit  
Johannes Riemann as Hans  
Hans Albers as Karl von Behn  
Rudolf Lettinger as F. A. Mertens 
Leonhard Haskel as Herr Garson  
Ilka Grüning as Frau Garson  
Hugo Werner-Kahle as Andrewowitsch Gosmol 
Trude Wessely as Lily, Karls Schwester  
Ferdinand Martini as A. S. 
Erich Schönfelder as Anno Labraiter  
Hilde Radney as Dekolletierte Dame  
Albert Paulig as Herr in der Loge  
Oscar Sabo as Rowdy  
Edmonde Guy as dancer 
Ernst van Duren as dancer

References

External links

Films of the Weimar Republic
Films directed by Erich Schönfelder
German silent feature films
German black-and-white films